The Fortuna Dam, officially known as Edwin Fabrega Dam, is an embankment dam in western Panama.

It is the single largest energy source in Panama, providing 30% of the country's electricity.  The Canadian public utility Hydro-Québec was an initial investor in the project, which was completed in 1984.

See also

 List of power stations in Panama

References

Dams completed in 1984
Energy infrastructure completed in 1984
Energy infrastructure completed in 1985
Hydroelectric power stations in Panama
Reservoirs in Panama
Buildings and structures in Chiriquí Province